Saint-Pierre-de-Nogaret is a commune in the Lozère department in southern France.

Notable people
It was the birthplace of Jean-Antoine Chaptal (1756-1832), chemist and statesman.

See also
Communes of the Lozère department

References

Saintpierredenogaret